Sanisvara Siva Temple is a Mandir situated at Gosagaresvara Precinct southern of Paradaresvara Siva Temple, Orissa, India. The temple is facing towards the east, enshrined deity is a circular Yoni Pitha at the center of a 1.00 square meter sanctum.

History
According to the local legend, during Ganga's rule around 14th-15th Century AD, Lord Siva once killed a calf inadvertently. In order to cleanse sin of killing the calf, he had to take a bath in the Gosagaresvara pond and worship the lord Gosagaresvara. Thus the tradition began up to the present. People keep the practice of taking ritual bath in the temple tank and worship Gosagaresvara to cleanse the sin of killing cow.

This temple is once used as a worshiping shrine. But at present, people consider it as a public living temple and classified as Pidha Deul typology.

Significance
Its significance among Hindu devotee is cultural: the Shivaratri festival. One of the most important event is the visit of Lord Lingaraj during the Durga Puja festival. Social: this temple is not only popular site among soon to be couple for their marriage ceremony but also for thread ceremony, etc. It is also significant among group of people such as association as public meetings are being held.

Location
The temple is located in Kapilaprasad, Khordha district, Bhubaneswar City, the capital of the Indian state of Orissa. It is surrounded by Paradaresvara Siva Temple in the north, Gosagaresvara tank in west, Minor Temple V in east and entrance gate is in the south.

Sources
Lesser Known Monuments of Bhubaneswar by Dr. Sadasiba Pradhan
Sanisvara Siva Temple, Kapilaprasad, Bhubaneswar, Dist.-Khurda

Shiva temples in Odisha
Hindu temples in Bhubaneswar